Charlotte Helena Mary Craddock (born 24 October 1990 in Wolverhampton, West Midlands), is an English field hockey player who was the youngest member of the British hockey squad for the 2008 Summer Olympics in Beijing.

Charlotte made her international debut as a forward in November 2007 against Argentina. She was the youngest member of the Team GB hockey squad at the Beijing 2008 Summer Olympics. Charlotte represented England in the 2010 Commonwealth Games in Delhi, India, where the Women's team won the bronze medal.

See also
 England at the 2010 Commonwealth Games

References

External links
 
 Charlotte Craddock at Olympics.com
www.telegraph.co.uk, Olympics: Charlotte Craddock set for Beijing
 Craddock shock at Team GB call-up. BBC News. Published 25 June 2008.

1990 births
People educated at Wolverhampton Grammar School
People educated at Repton School
Commonwealth Games bronze medallists for England
English female field hockey players
Olympic field hockey players of Great Britain
British female field hockey players
Field hockey players at the 2008 Summer Olympics
Field hockey players at the 2010 Commonwealth Games
Sportspeople from Wolverhampton
Living people
Commonwealth Games medallists in field hockey
Cannock Hockey Club players
Female field hockey forwards
Medallists at the 2010 Commonwealth Games